ULP may refer to:

Science and technology
 Unit in the last place in computer science
 File extension for CadSoft/Autodesk EAGLE User Language Program

Organisations
 Université Louis Pasteur, Strasbourg, France
 Former United Labour Party (New Zealand)
 Unity Labour Party,  Saint Vincent and the Grenadines

Other uses
 Unfair labor practice, in US labor law
 Quilpie Airport, IATA airport code "ULP"